West Falls Church is a Washington Metro station in Idylwood, Virginia on the Orange Line, the first station inside the beltway on the Orange Line going east. It is one of only two stations in the system to have three tracks, the other being the National Airport station. The center track is used for train storage, and for relaying trains to the adjacent Falls Church Yard.

Facilities

The station serves the suburban community of Falls Church and the Northern Virginia Center operated by Virginia Tech and the University of Virginia. While the station has a street address on Haycock Road, it is physically located in the median of Interstate 66 near Virginia State Route 7 (Leesburg Pike); riders access the platform and mezzanine by means of an elevated walkway from the parking area.

This is a suburban transfer station, as commuter buses that serve communities near the Dulles Toll and Access Roads (Virginia State Route 267) connect to the Metro system at West Falls Church using a bus-only exit from the Access Road. These buses include Fairfax Connector to points within Fairfax including Reston and Herndon, Metrobus to Tysons Corner, and Loudoun County Transit reverse commute routes to businesses including AOL and MCI and transfer points in Dulles.

With the opening of the Silver Line on July 26, 2014, many commuter bus routes that formerly terminated at West Falls Church were rerouted to instead terminate at locations along the new Silver Line stations in Tysons Corner and Reston.  West Falls Church was also the original staging point for Washington Flyer buses to Dulles Airport, but this shifted to Wiehle-Reston East with the opening of the Silver Line.

The Silver Line joins the Orange Line via a flying junction immediately east of this station but does not serve the station. Plans originally called for the Silver Line to stop at West Falls Church, but it was cut out of the final plan.

History
The station opened on June 7, 1986.

In 1999, the station was renamed West Falls Church–VT/UVA, when the initialisms for Virginia Tech and the University of Virginia were added to the station's name, two years after the dedication of the shared graduate center. These initialisms were moved to a subtitle location on November 3, 2011.

In May 2018, Metro announced an extensive renovation of platforms at twenty stations across the system. The platforms at the West Falls Church station would be rebuilt starting in late 2020.

From May 23 until August 15, 2020, this station was closed due to the platform reconstruction project which closed stations west of Ballston–MU station. On August 16, 2020, the station reopened as the Orange Line terminus when Silver and Orange Line trains were able to bypass East Falls Church station.

On September 11, 2022, the station's name was changed to drop the "UVA" initialism from the subtitle name, leaving the full name as West Falls Church–VT.

Station layout

References

External links 

The Schumin Web Transit Center: West Falls Church Station 
Station from Google Maps Street View

Bus stations in Virginia
Stations on the Orange Line (Washington Metro)
Washington Metro stations in Virginia
Railway stations in the United States opened in 1986
Transportation in Fairfax County, Virginia
1986 establishments in Virginia
Railway stations in highway medians